HD 204313 is a star with two and possibly three exoplanetary companions in the southern constellation of Capricornus. With an apparent magnitude of 7.99, it is an eighth magnitude star that is too faint to be readily visible to the naked eye. The star is located at a distance of 157 light years from the Sun based on parallax measurements, but it is drifting closer with a radial velocity of −10 km/s.

This is an ordinary G-type main-sequence star with a stellar classification of G5V, which indicates it is generating energy through hydrogen fusion at its core. It is an estimated four billion years old, chromospherically extremely quiet, and is spinning with a projected rotational velocity of just 0.8 km/s. The star has a slightly larger mass and radius compared to the Sun. It is radiating 118% of the luminosity of the Sun from its photosphere at an effective temperature of 5,783 K.

Planetary system
This star was in observation by the CORALIE radial velocity planet-search program since the year 2000. In August 2009, a superjovian planetary companion was announced. Two years later, a hot Neptune HD 204313 c on a 35-day orbit was announced, followed by a third Jupiter-like planet candidate HD 204313 d on a 2800-day orbit, which was announced in 2012. A 2015 study independently confirmed the first two discoveries, but did not detect any significant signal at the claimed period of planet d. Another study in 2022 agreed with these results, in addition to finding a new planet or brown dwarf, designated HD 204313 e to differentiate it from the dubious candidate. The inclination and true mass of planets b & e were measured via astrometry. Assuming that planet d exists, planets b & d are apparently orbiting close to a 7:5 mean motion resonance, which may be stabilizing their periods.

See also 
 HD 147018
 HD 171238
 List of extrasolar planets

References 

G-type main-sequence stars
Planetary systems with two confirmed planets

Capricornus (constellation)
J21281220-2143340
CD–22 5691
204313
106006